Enter: The Conquering Chicken is The Gits' second full-length album, recorded in 1993 and released posthumously in 1994 on C/Z Records. Lead singer and songwriter Mia Zapata was raped and strangled to death in July 1993 during production of the record. The remainder of the band completed the album with what they had finished so far, and disbanded shortly thereafter.

Enter: The Conquering Chicken shows Mia Zapata pushing the blues influences that informed her vocal style to the forefront more directly than on Frenching the Bully, with songs like "A Change Is Gonna Come" (a recontextualized cover of soul singer Sam Cooke's original) and "Precious Blood." The band also arguably furthers their hardcore influences on songs like "Sign of the Crab," "Spear & Magic Helmet" and "Drunks."

The record was reissued in 2003, with bonus tracks and different cover art, on the Broken Rekids label.

The song "Sign of the Crab" was written by Zapata, imagining her murder at the hands of a stranger.

Track listing
 "Bob (Cousin O.)" – 3:04
 "Guilt Within Your Head" – 2:26
 "Seaweed" – 2:23
 "A Change Is Gonna Come" – 4:03
 "Precious Blood" – 3:46
 "Beauty of the Rose" – 2:36
 "Drunks" – 1:37
 "Italian Song" – 2:07
 "Social Love I" – 2:39
 "Social Love II" – 1:51
 "Spear & Magic Helmet" – 2:43
 "Drinking Song" – 2:55
 "Sign of the Crab" – 2:33

Reissue track listing
 "Bob (Cousin O.)" – 3:03
 "Guilt Within Your Head" – 2:25
 "Seaweed" – 2:25
 "A Change Is Gonna Come" – 4:02
 "Precious Blood" – 3:45
 "Beauty of the Rose" – 2:36
 "Drunks" – 1:37
 "Italian Song" – 2:07
 "Social Love I" – 2:39
 "Social Love II" – 1:50
 "Daily Bread" – 4:33
 "Sign of the Crab" – 2:34
 "Drinking Song" – 2:55
 "I'm Lou" – 1:55
 "New Fast One" – 2:00
 "Sign Of The Crab (Live)" – 2:46
 "Seaweed (Live)" – 2:29
 "Beauty Of The Rose (Live)" – 2:44
 "Whirlwind (Live)" – 2:59
 "New Fast One (Live)" – 2:01
 "Bob (Cousin O.) (Live)" – 3:07
 "A Change Is Gonna Come (Alternate Take)" - 4:13
Live tracks recorded at the X-Ray Cafe, Portland, Oregon in June 1993.

References 

The Gits albums
1994 albums